Megaw is a surname. Notable people with the surname include:
 Eric Megaw (1908 – 1956) Irish Engineer
 Helen Megaw (1907–2002), Irish crystallographer
 John Megaw (1909–1997), British judge and rugby union player
 Peter Megaw (1910–2006), Irish architectural historian and archaeologist
 Robert Megaw (1869–1947), Northern Irish barrister and politician
 Vincent Megaw (born 1934), Australian archaeologist, also his wife Ruth Megaw

See also 
 Megaw Island